Polygrammodes hintzi is a moth in the family Crambidae. It was described by Strand in 1911. It is found in Cameroon.

References

Spilomelinae
Moths described in 1911
Moths of Africa